BR-156 is a federal highway of Brazil.

The road consists of 552 km between Oiapoque and Macapá, and 271 km between Macapá and Laranjal do Jari (except via Santana city), totalling 823 km of road through forest and savannah. Only the road between Macapá and Calçoene is paved with asphalt. The rest of the road has a dirt surface.

Because of the road conditions, it takes around 10-12 hours to drive between Oiapoque and Macapá.

With the Oyapock River Bridge (linking the cities of Oiapoque in Brazil and Saint-Georges-de-l'Oyapock in French Guiana) open to traffic starting from 20 March 2017, it is now possible to drive from Macapá to Cayenne, the capital city of French Guiana.

References 

Federal highways in Brazil
Transport in Amapá